Ochakovo is a Russian beverage company producing both alcoholic and non-alcoholic drinks. Focused mainly on the production of beer and kvas, Ochakovo ranks among the leaders in the latter category within the Russian Federation, being the second largest brand by market share in 2018. In addition to its own brands, Ochakovo produces drinks wholesale for Russian retailers such as X5 Retail Group.

History

Ochakovo was originally founded in 1978 as the Московский пиво-безалкогольный комбинат (Moscow beer and non-alcoholic [beverages] plant), a state-owned company, with a view to producing beverages for participants and spectators in the upcoming 1980 Moscow Olympics. In 1993 the company was privatised, becoming a joint-stock company. While the company maintains a respectable position within Russia, and has managed to open up foreign markets since the dissolution of the USSR, Ochakovo has slowly been losing market share in both the alcoholic and non-alcoholic beverage segments under pressure from multinational competitors such as Carlsberg, Coca-Cola and PepsiCo as well as from newer Russian firms such as Deka, going from holding a 39% of the market share for kvas production in 2009 to 18% in 2018.

In the aftermath of the 2022 Russian invasion of Ukraine, the company announced it was introducing a new line of soft drinks, allegedly intended as a substitute, or at least as competition, for Western brands that are expected to either withdraw from the Russian market or progressively reduce their production. In May 2022 Ochakovo launched Cool Cola (cola-flavoured), Fancy (orange-flavoured) and Street (lemon and lime-flavoured) as substitutes for Coca-Cola and Pepsi, Fanta and Mirinda, and Sprite and 7 Up, respectively. In June of the same year the company announced plans to launch apple cider production in the territory of Krasnodar Krai under the brand name Will's, with a view to replacing the main cider producers in the country, Heineken and Carlsberg, who announced their withdrawal from the Russian market.

Museum of Traditional Beverages

Opened in 2005, the museum claims to be the only one of its kind in Russia, exhibiting kvas- and beer-making tools and equipment, different brewing procedures and offering a degustation of the company's products.

Brands

Excluding production for retail chains, Ochakovo sells their products under the following brands, according to the company's website (in Russian):

Beer:
 Zhigulyovskoe
 456
 L.E.P.
 Sekret Pivovara
 Yachmenny Kolos
 Khalzan (alcoholic and non-alcoholic)
 Steppenwolf
 Altstein
 Zlatovice
 Ledokol (strong beers)
 Ochakovo
 Pugach

Bottled water:
 Gorny khrustal'

Carbonated drinks:
 Reddot (Cola with no refined sugars)

Cocktails:
 BlackMix
 Mokhito
 Ochakovo
 RedRay

Energy drinks:
 Fitoenerdzhi (kvas with guarana)
 Powran

Hard seltzers:
 Street

Juice:
 Sochnaya komanda
 Goodini
 Akh! (traditional Russian flavours such as tarkhun)
 Mokhito
 Street
 CoolCola
 Fancy

Kvas:
 Kvasyonok (alcohol-free kvas for children)
 Ochakovsky
 Semeyny sekret

Medovukha:
 Medovukha polusladkaya
 Medovukha traditsionnaya

Vodka:
 Ochakovskaya
 Zapal

Wines:
 Avtokhtonnoe
 Butterfly
 Kuban
 Tamani
 Yubileynoe

References 

Food and drink companies established in 1978
Food and drink companies based in Moscow
Manufacturing companies based in Moscow
Drink companies of Russia
1978 establishments in Russia